Shen Xiaoming (born May 1963) is a Chinese politician who is currently the Communist Party secretary of Hunan.

A pediatrician by training, Shen rose through the ranks in the health and education bureaucracy of Shanghai. He successively served as party chief of Pudong and vice minister of education. From 2017 to 2020, he served as the Governor of Hainan, and as Hainan's party secretary from 2020 to 2023.

Life and career
Shen was born in Shangyu County, Zhejiang Province. He attended Wenzhou Medical College and obtained a degree in pediatrics.  He then attended Shanghai Jiaotong University and obtained a doctoral degree in pediatric medicine.  After graduating he became the deputy head and then head of the Xinhua Hospital, then president of the Second Medical University of Shanghai, then executive vice president of Shanghai Jiaotong University. He then entered the commission on education and health of Shanghai.

In January 2008, he was named vice mayor of Shanghai. In May 2013, he was named party chief of Pudong, joining the municipal Standing Committee two months later. On April 8, 2015, he succeeded Ai Baojun to become head administrator of the Shanghai Free-Trade Zone.

In October 2016, Shen was appointed as the Deputy Minister of Education. Shen was appointed as the acting Governor of Hainan in April 2017.

References

External links 
 Official biography of Shen Xiaoming

1963 births
People from Shangyu
Governors of Hainan
Wenzhou Medical College alumni
People's Republic of China politicians from Zhejiang
Chinese Communist Party politicians from Zhejiang
Political office-holders in Shanghai
Living people
Politicians from Shaoxing
Political office-holders in Hainan
Members of the 19th Central Committee of the Chinese Communist Party
Chinese paediatricians
Physicians from Zhejiang
Members of the National Academy of Medicine